The Wanting is the fourth solo album by Glenn Jones, guitarist and founding member of the American instrumental band Cul de Sac.  Mojo placed the album at number 33 on its list of "Top 50 albums of 2011."

Track listing

 A Snapshot of Mom, Scotland, 1957
The Great Pacific Northwest
The Great Swamp Way Rout
Anchor Chain Blues
Even to Win is to Fail
My Charlotte Blue Notebook
Menotomy River Blues
Of Its Own Kind
The Wanting
Twenty-Three Years in Happy Valley, or Love Among the Chickenshit
The Orca Grande Cement Factory at Victorville

References

2011 albums
Instrumental albums